Otwiernica is a small river of southwestern Poland. It flows into the Czernica near Wymiarki.

Rivers of Poland
Rivers of Lubusz Voivodeship